The Indianapolis mayoral election of 1929 took place on November 5, 1929, and saw Democrat Reginald H. Sullivan in a landslide victory. Incumbent mayor, Democrat Lemuel Ertus Slack, had been appointed mayor in 1927 following the resignation of Republican John L. Duvall after he was charged with corruption by the state.

Duvall had been elected mayor in 1925 with the support of the Ku Klux Klan, and the Marion County Republican Party had close Klan ties. The City Council and school board both were composed of Klan-supported members. Opposition arose by 1929 to both the Klan and to the corruption in the city government.

Sullivan's victory was seen as a rebuke of the Ku Klux Klan.

The Republican nominee was businessman Alfed M. Glossbrenner.

Sullivan spent much of the campaign in a hospital bed after being injured in an airplane crash.

Sullivan received strong support from African American and Catholic voters.

Coinciding mayoral elections across the state also saw  Klan-supported, generally Republican, mayors  voted out and replaced by  new, generally Democratic, mayors. Anderson, Elkhart, Evansville, Fort Wayne, Lafayette, Muncie, and Terre Haute all replaced Klan-supported Republicans with Democratic mayors in what the New York Times hoped would be, "The dawn of a more liberal and cleaner political day in Indiana".

References

1929
1929 United States mayoral elections
1929 Indiana elections